Cyclobutanol is an organic compound with the chemical formula C4H8O. It contains a cyclobutyl group with a hydroxyl group attached to it.

References 

Cycloalkanols
Cyclobutyl compounds